The Scepter of Judah was a text produced by the Sephardi historian Solomon Ibn Verga. It first appeared in Turkey in 1553.

The work was essentially a comprehensive analysis of sixty-four different persecutions that the Jewish people had suffered since antiquity. Hardly an insular text, it made use of Latin sources as well. It also had a certain anthropological value, as Ibn Verga discussed the customs and practices of Jews in various lands. Ibn Verga also sought to highlight what he felt were the faults of his people, and as such, much of his criticisms of the Jews are exaggerated for effect.

In many ways the Scepter of Judah was the first and most significant work of Jewish historiography; it was essentially the first time that such a comprehensive interest had been expressed by the Jews in their past. Ibn Verga sought to clarify the problem of anti-Jewish sentiment, which had manifested itself in the expulsion of the Jews from Spain in 1492. According to the author, the expulsion from Spain and Jewish exile in general were natural phenomena that were subject to historical forces of causation and explanation. They were not simply "punishment" for the sins of the Jewish people, as had been the time-honored way of explaining such misfortunes.

The text posited the view that the hatred of the Jews is a popular inheritance which is passed from generation to generation. It is occasioned by religious fanaticism (as had been the case in Spain) and is compounded by envy and jealousy; it also stems from a lack of education. Ibn Verga also suggested that there was perhaps too much flaunting of opulence amongst the Sephardim; certain festivities had been too extravagant, which had raised antagonism and jealousy amongst Catholics.  Whether this was actually the case is debatable.

The Scepter of Judah was one of the most popular Jewish history books of all time, perhaps the most popular until the 19th century.

References
 Jewish Encyclopedia: Solomon Ibn Verga
 

Historiography
Jewish literature
1553 books
Books about antisemitism
Jews and Judaism in the Ottoman Empire
Jewish Spanish history